The 2021 Penza Oblast gubernatorial election took place on 17–19 September 2021, on common election day, coinciding with election to the State Duma. Acting Governor Oleg Melnichenko was elected for his first term.

Background
Governor Ivan Belozertsev in 2020 won re-election to his second term with 78.72% of the vote. On 21 March 2021, less than a year after the election, Governor Belozertsev was arrested, he was charged with accepting a  ₽31 million ($0.4 million) bribe from former Senator from Penza Oblast (2003-2013) and pharmaceutical executive Boris Shpigel. Simultaneously, Investigative Committee announced that they had found facts of electoral fraud during 2020 gubernatorial election. On 26 March President Vladimir Putin fired Belozertsev for the "loss of trust" and appointed Senator Oleg Melnichenko as acting Governor of Penza Oblast. Melnichenko previously served in the Government of Penza Oblast in 2007-2009 as Minister of Education and Science, Vice Governor and Deputy Head of Government, and as Deputy Presidential Envoy to the Volga Federal District (2013-2017).

Candidates
Only political parties can nominate candidates for gubernatorial election in Penza Oblast, self-nomination is not possible. However, candidate is not obliged to be a member of the nominating party. Candidate for Governor of Penza Oblast should be a Russian citizen and at least 30 years old. Candidates for Governor should not have a foreign citizenship or residence permit. Each candidate in order to be registered is required to collect at least 253 signatures of members and heads of municipalities. Also gubernatorial candidates present 3 candidacies to the Federation Council and election winner later appoints one of the presented candidates.

Registered candidates
Pyotr Chugay (RPPSS), Member of Penza City Duma, 2020 gubernatorial candidate
Oleg Melnichenko (United Russia), acting Governor of Penza Oblast, former Senator of the Federation Council (2017–2021)
Oleg Shalyapin (CPRF), Deputy Head of Penza, Member of Penza City Duma, 2020 gubernatorial candidate
Aleksey Shpagin (SR-ZP), general director of LLP "Gelios"
Aleksandr Vasilyev (LDPR), Member of the Legislative Assembly of Penza Oblast, 2020 gubernatorial candidate

Withdrawn candidates
Anna Ochkina (SR-ZP), professor at Penza State University, 2020 gubernatorial candidate (withdrew due to affiliation with "foreign agent" organisation)

Lost nomination
Aleksandr Lomovtsev (United Russia), Member of the Legislative Assembly of Penza Oblast

Candidates for the Federation Council
Pyotr Chugay (RPPSS):
Aleksandr Lomakin, pensioner
Aleksey Panfilov, chairman of regional Council of GSFG Veterans
Lidiya Panfilova, chairwoman of the RPPSS Penza city office
Oleg Melnichenko (United Russia):
Aleksandr Gulyakov, rector of Penza State University
Marat Lebedev, oral surgeon at Penza Oblast Clinical Hospital
Maria Lvova-Belova, incumbent Senator of the Federation Council
Oleg Shalyapin (CPRF):
Dmitry Filyaev, director of Penza Middle School №58
Georgy Kamnev, member of the Legislative Assembly of Penza Oblast, member of the Presidium of the CPRF Central Committee
Oksana Milayeva, member of Penza City Duma, professor of philosophy at Penza State University
Aleksey Shpagin (SR-ZP):
Mikhail Irikov, chairman of the board of consumer society "Kirova 55"
Lyudmila Kharitonova, farmer
Gennady Lukyanchikov, wireman
Aleksandr Vasilyev (LDPR):
Vladimir Bystryakov, coordinator of the LPDR Penza city office
Pavel Kulikov, Deputy Head of Penza, member of Penza City Duma, coordinator of the LDPR Penza regional office
Vadim Serdovintsev, member of Nizhny Lomov Assembly of Representatives

Results

|- style="background-color:#E9E9E9;text-align:center;"
! style="text-align:left;" colspan=2| Candidate
! style="text-align:left;"| Party
! width="75"|Votes
! width="30"|%
|-
| style="background-color:;"|
| style="text-align:left;"| Oleg Melnichenko (incumbent)
| style="text-align:left;"| United Russia
| 428,868
| 72.38
|-
| style="background-color:;"|
| style="text-align:left;"| Oleg Shalyapin
| style="text-align:left;"| Communist Party
| 73,153
| 12.35
|-
| style="background-color:;"|
| style="text-align:left;"| Aleksey Shpagin
| style="text-align:left;"| A Just Russia — For Truth
| 33,714
| 5.69
|-
| style="background-color:;"|
| style="text-align:left;"| Aleksandr Vasilyev
| style="text-align:left;"| Liberal Democratic Party
| 33,593
| 5.67
|-
| style="background-color:|
| style="text-align:left;"| Pyotr Chugay
| style="text-align:left;"| Party of Pensioners
| 13,650
| 2.30
|-
| style="text-align:left;" colspan="3"| Valid votes
| 582,978
| 98.39
|-
| style="text-align:left;" colspan="3"| Blank ballots
| 9,540
| 1.61
|- style="font-weight:bold"
| style="text-align:left;" colspan="3"| Total
| 592,518
| 100.00
|-
| style="background-color:#E9E9E9;" colspan="6"|
|-
| style="text-align:left;" colspan="3"| Turnout
| 592,518
| 56.96
|-
| style="text-align:left;" colspan="3"| Registered voters
| 1,040,202
| 100.00
|-
| colspan="5" style="background-color:#E9E9E9;"|
|- style="font-weight:bold"
| colspan="4" |Source:
|
|}

Incumbent Senator Maria Lvova-Belova (United Russia) was re-appointed to the Federation Council.

References

Penza Oblast
September 2021 events in Russia
Politics of Penza Oblast